Verconia romeri is a species of colourful sea slug, a dorid nudibranch, a shell-less marine gastropod mollusk in the family Chromodorididae.

Distribution 
This marine species occurs off Australia and New Caledonia.

Description

Ecology

References

 Risbec, J. 1928. Contribution à l’étude des nudibranches Néo-Calédoniens. Faune des Colonies Françaises 2(1): 1–328
 Marshall, J.G. & Willan, R.C. 1999. Nudibranchs of Heron Island, Great Barrier Reef. Leiden : Backhuys 257 pp.

Chromodorididae
Gastropods described in 1928